Woodstock is a live album by Jimi Hendrix released posthumously on August 20, 1994. It presents some of Hendrix's performance at Woodstock Festival on August 18, 1969. The album was replaced by a more-complete version in 1999 titled Live at Woodstock, albeit with some of the performers mixed out.

Critical reception 

In a contemporary review for The Village Voice, music critic Robert Christgau said the under-rehearsed, highly eccentric music on Woodstock makes for what was a transitional but all-important live album by Hendrix: "All in all, your basic rock concert as act of flawed genius. Does this kind of thing happen any more? Not on such a scale for sure."

Although Live at Woodstock (1999) was later released as a more comprehensive record of Hendrix's performance, Christgau felt the "condensed reconfiguration" offered by the 1994 album magnified the concert's "aura". AllMusic's Jason Anderson was less enthusiastic, deeming it "very significant" but not very well recorded, with fairly dull versions of "Fire" and "Purple Haze".

Track listing

Personnel
Jimi Hendrix – lead guitar, vocals
Mitch Mitchell – drums
Billy Cox – bass guitar
Larry Lee – rhythm guitar
Juma Sultan – percussion
Jerry Velez – percussion

References

External links 
 

Live albums published posthumously
Jimi Hendrix live albums
1994 live albums
Albums produced by Alan Douglas (record producer)
MCA Records live albums